Thomas Wiley Feagin (August 28, 1937 – August 20, 1990) was an American football guard in the National Football League for the Baltimore Colts and the Washington Redskins.  He played college football at the University of Texas and the University of Houston.

References

1937 births
1990 deaths
American football offensive guards
Baltimore Colts players
Houston Cougars football players
People from Houston
Texas Longhorns football players
Washington Redskins players
Conroe High School alumni